The S&NA North Subdivision is a railroad line owned by CSX Transportation in the U.S. states of Tennessee and Alabama. At its north end the line continues south from the Nashville Terminal Subdivision Main Section and at its south end the line continues south as the Boyles Terminal Subdivision of the Atlanta Division.

See also
 List of CSX Transportation lines

References

CSX Transportation lines
Rail infrastructure in Alabama
Rail infrastructure in Tennessee